is a Japanese football club based in Akita, the capital city of Akita Prefecture. They play in the Tohoku Soccer League. Their team colour is red.

History 
The club based in Akita, Akita, was founded as Ashikaga Komuten Kawabe FC in 1973. The team absorbed the Akita City Government FC in 2006 and were renamed as FC Akita Cambiare. It has been redefined again as Akita FC Cambiare in 2010.

League & cup record

Key

Honours 
All Japan Senior Football Championship (1):
Champions: 1987
Tohoku Soccer League (1):
Champions: 1985
Tohoku Soccer League Division 2 North (4):
Champions: 2001, 2006, 2007, 2017

Current squad

Former players

Kazuhiro Kawata
Kenji Suzuki (footballer)
Jumpei Saito
Kazuya Inagaki
Kazuki Sato
Masatoshi Ozawa

Emperor's Cup Prefectural Match Records

Songs and chants 

 City Anthem of Akita - Audio

Lyrics

References

External links 

Ameba website

 
Football clubs in Japan
Association football clubs established in 1973
Sports teams in Akita Prefecture
Sport in Akita (city)
1973 establishments in Japan